Iben Hjejle (22 March 1971) is a Danish actress, notable for starring in the Stephen Frears film High Fidelity (2000). In Denmark, she is perhaps best known for appearing in the Danish television sitcom Langt fra Las Vegas (Far from Las Vegas) and playing the girlfriend of Danish comedian Casper Christensen, her former real life partner. She also plays Christensen's girlfriend in the sitcom Klovn (Clown) and the title role in the TV crime series Dicte.

Career 
Iben Hjejle has starred in a series of Danish movies, including a Dogme 95 movie, and also in Danish-produced action films such as Old Men in New Cars. She also played the Swedish Queen Sofia Magdalena in SVT's successful period drama production of The Marriage of Gustav III in 2001. Hjejle also appeared in the 1996 film Portland, Mifune's Last Song in 1999, The Emperor's New Clothes in 2002, and in Dreaming of Julia and Flickering Lights in 2003. For her performance in Mifune's Last Song, she won an Honourable Mention at the 49th Berlin International Film Festival. It was also at the same festival that she was discovered by Stephen Frears, who offered her a part in his film High Fidelity (2000), where she played John Cusack's character's girlfriend Laura. In 2008 he offered her a part in Chéri, in a cameo as Marie Laure. Her involvement was a part of a minor international comeback. Additionally, the same year she worked on Defiance with Daniel Craig and in 2009 she filmed The Eclipse, which received a limited theatrical release in 2010.

Hjejle was a part of the Danish popular television series Anna Pihl until it ended in April 2008, after three seasons. In 2012, she was cast as the lead in the crime show Dicte The show debuted in early 2013, and while its reviews were mixed, Hjejle received good reviews for her performance.

She had a part in Lars von Trier's Direktøren for det hele (2006, also known as The Boss of It All).

Personal life 
Hjejle was born in Copenhagen. From 1996 to 1999, she was married to Emil de Waal. She turned down the role of Éowyn in Peter Jackson's The Lord of the Rings film trilogy because she did not like the idea of being so far from home. In an episode of Langt fra Las Vegas, her character Liva makes a joke about The Lord of the Rings: The Fellowship of the Ring.

Filmography

References

External links 
 
 

1971 births
Actresses from Copenhagen
Danish film actresses
Danish television actresses
Living people
People from Gladsaxe Municipality